Rileysburg is a small unincorporated community in Highland Township, Vermillion County, in the U.S. state of Indiana.
The town is served by the post office in Covington in nearby Fountain County. The county seat is located in Newport.

History
A post office was established at Rileysburg in 1887, and remained in operation until it was discontinued in 1934. The town plat was officially filed in 1904.

Geography
A CSX Transportation railway runs northwest through town into nearby Danville, Illinois. Coal Branch Creek, which flows south through the county to the Vermilion River, has its head near Rileysburg.

References

Unincorporated communities in Vermillion County, Indiana
Unincorporated communities in Indiana
Terre Haute metropolitan area